Warney may refer to the following people:

 Jameel Warney (born 1994), American basketball player
 Shane Warne (1969–2022), Australian cricketer and media personality, nicknamed Warney
 Warney Cresswell (1897-1973), English cricketer